Macetown is an historic gold mining settlement in the Otago region of the South Island of New Zealand. It is now uninhabited but has become a tourist attraction. Access to the town is via an unsealed road that heads up the steep-sided Arrow gorge. This can be traversed on foot or by mountain bike, horse or four-wheel-drive vehicles. The road crosses the Arrow River or its side creeks 22 times and is not suitable for two-wheel-drive cars. The start of the road is found in the Arrowtown car park.

History
In 1862 the sailor William Fox discovered gold in the Arrow River. By the end of that year over 1,500 miners were camped along the river and a small canvas town had grown up at the junction of 12 Mile Creek and the Arrow River. Amongst those that flocked to the area were three brothers: John, Charles and Harry Mace, after whom the town came to be known. In 1863 the population was around 300. At its height the town boasted a school, a church and two hotels.

By 1865 most of the alluvial gold had been extracted and many miners left for the gold fields of the West Coast. Quartz mining attracted more people in the 1870s and the population climbed to a peak of 206 in 1896.

By the start of the 20th century, the town was in decline and has long since been deserted. Little remains of the original buildings but Needham's House (the old schoolmaster's house) and the bakehouse have been faithfully restored by the Department of Conservation.

Residents
Joseph Needham was a gold miner and the Macetown schoolmaster from 1879 to 1889. He married a widow, Mrs Heads, who had one daughter, Mary, and a son, John Thomas. Mr and Mrs Needham had a daughter, Nellie, and their son was named Locksley. Mary Heads married Mr Thomas McSoriley and they were for many years the proprietors of the nine-bedroom Beach House (later O'Connell's Hotel) in Queenstown. One of their sons, Pat, became the captain of the tss Earnslaw on Lake Wakatipu.

William Tily Smith ran a store in Macetown for over fifty years. He also did the twice-weekly mail run to Arrowtown and built the bakehouse.

Oliver Palmer was a member of the 'Twelve Apostles', a group of miners who spent all their money on gambling and alcohol. They would gather at the Montezuma Hut and referred to each other by a variety of lofty titles such as 'The King', 'The Doctor' or 'The Saint'.

Many Macetown residents migrated to Arrowtown in the early 1900s to work in Queenstown. These included the Anderson family, who ran the Alpine hotel in Macetown, and the Tallentire family. The youngest son, Thomas Tallentire, later became the editor of the Queenstown Daily Mail in the early 1930s.

William Jenkins frequently rode wildly through the streets of Macetown. By 1921 he was the only remaining resident and promptly declared himself Mayor. His mother had run the Alpine Hotel.
 
Macetown had a small Chinese community which was based near the end of the main street in an area known as "Chinatown". The Chinese miners annually celebrated Chinese New Year with a feast and a display of fireworks to the delight of all.

Notes

References

Further reading

External links
Macetown - Department of Conservation

Ghost towns in Otago
Geography of Otago
Otago Gold Rush
Tourist attractions in Otago
1862 establishments in New Zealand
20th-century disestablishments in New Zealand
Populated places established in 1862
Populated places disestablished in the 20th century